Events from the year 1668 in Denmark.

Incumbents 

 Monarch - Frederick III

Events

Undated

Births

Full date unknown

Deaths 
 July 26 - Hans Svane, statesman (born 1606)

Full date unknown

References 

 
Denmark
Years of the 17th century in Denmark